A steam railcar, steam motor car (US), or Railmotor (UK) is a railcar that is self powered by a steam engine. The first steam railcar was an experimental unit designed and built in 1847 by James Samuel and William Bridges Adams in Britain. In 1848 they made the Fairfield steam carriage that they sold to the Bristol & Exeter Railway, who used it for two years on a branch line.

Origins
The first steam railcar was designed by James Samuel, the Eastern Counties Railway Locomotive Engineer, built by William Bridges Adams in 1847, and trialled between Shoreditch and Cambridge on 23 October 1847. The following year Samuel and Adams built the Fairfield steam carriage. After trials in 1848, it was sold to the Bristol & Exeter Railway and ran for two years on the Tiverton branch.

History by country

Argentina
In 1905, the Buenos Aires Great Southern Railway purchased a steam railcar from Kerr, Stuart and Company. Birmingham Railway Carriage and Wagon Company supplied a twin-car unit with an oil-fired boiler in 1931 to the Entre Ríos Railway.

Australia

In 1883, the Victorian Railways purchased the Rowan steam railmotor. Two double-decker units were imported from Belgium by the South Australian Railways in 1895.

In 1913, Kerr, Stuart and Company built a boiler, shipped it to Australia and the Victorian Railways assembled the Kerr Stuart steam railmotor.

Austria–Hungary

In 1880, Ringhoffer of Prague built a steam railcar for the Österreichische Lokaleisenbahngesellschaft (Austrian local railway). In the early 20th century, the Imperial Royal Austrian State Railways ordered a railcar with a Serpollet boiler from Esslingen, followed by a number of cars with boilers from Komarek of Vienna and carriages from Ringhoffer. The Niederösterreichische Landesbahnen (Lower Austrian State Railway) also bought cars made by Komarek and Rohrbacher. Most cars had been withdrawn by the end of World War I, and those that remained when Austria-Hungary was divided in 1918 were divided between the Czechoslovak State Railways and the Austrian Federal Railways. All units having been withdrawn by the end of the 1950s,  one car is preserved operational at the Czech Railway Museum in Lužná (Rakovník District).

Between 1901 and 1908, Ganz Works of Budapest and de Dion-Bouton of Paris collaborated to build a number of railcars for the Hungarian State Railways together with units with de Dion-Bouton boilers, Ganz steam motors and equipments, and Raba carriages built by the Raba Hungarian Wagon and Machine Factory in Győr. In 1908, the Borzsavölgyi Gazdasági Vasút (BGV), a narrow-gauge railway in Carpathian Ruthenia (today's Ukraine), purchased five railcars from Ganz and four railcars from the Hungarian Royal State Railway Machine Factory with de Dion-Bouton boilers. The Ganz company started to export steam motor railcars to the United Kingdom, Italy, Canada, Japan, Russia and Bulgaria.

Brazil 
In 1928, the Leopoldina Railway (de) purchased a steam railcar for inspection services by Sentinel Waggon Works.

Britain

Steam railcars to be built in Britain in the early 20th century for the London & South Western Railway (L&SWR) and before entering passenger service one was lent to the Great Western Railway (GWR) for a trial run in the Stroud Valley between Chalford and Stonehouse in Gloucestershire. Between 1902 and 1911, 197 steam railcars were built, 99 by the GWR.

Introduced either due to competition from the new electric tramways or to provide an economic service on lightly used country branch lines, there were two main designs, either a powered bogie enclosed in a rigid body or an articulated engine unit and carriage, pivoting on a pin. However, with little reserve power steam railcars were inflexible and the ride quality was poor due to excessive vibration and oscillation. Most were replaced by an autotrain, adapted carriages and a push-pull steam locomotive as these were able to haul additional carriages or goods wagons.

After trials in 1924, the London and North Eastern Railway purchased three types of steam railcars from Sentinel-Cammell and Claytons.

Egypt

Experiments with a steam railcar in 1926 led to the acquisition of many examples of this type of vehicle by the Egyptian State Railways.  Clayton Wagons supplied six twin-car units in 1928. Birmingham Railway Carriage and Wagon Company 13 similar vehicles in 1930. Sentinel and Metro-Cammell supplied ten twin-car units in 1934.

In 1951, Sentinel and Metro-Cammell built ten 3-car steam railcar units for the Egyptian National Railways. The units were articulated, with an oil-fired boiler supplying steam to two 6-cylinder steam motors. Withdrawn from service in 1962,  one unit is under restoration at the Buckinghamshire Railway Centre.

France

 
At the beginning of the 20th century Société Valentin Purrey patented a steam engine that was used in railcars. Built in Bordeaux by 1903 fifty cars had been built, including 40 to the Compagnie Générale des Omnibus-Paris. Also, Buffaud & Robatel built a steam railcar for the metre gauge Chemin de fer de Kayes au Niger in Mali.

Germany

In 1879, Georg Thomas of the Hessian Ludwig Railway developed a double-decker steam railcar, for which he was granted a patent in 1881. The three-axle vehicle consisted of a single-axle engine unit and a two-axle double-deck carriage part, rigidly coupled together and separable only in the workshop. The Hessian Ludwig Railway built three in 1879–80, followed by the Royal Saxon State Railways, the Oels-Gniezno Railway and the Royal Württemberg State Railways. The Royal Bavarian State Railways built a similar Bavarian MCi in 1882. All had been withdrawn in the early 20th century.

In 1895, the Royal Württemberg State Railways ordered a steam railcar using a Serpollet boiler from Esslingen, followed by six more. At first, their performance was unsatisfactory, until Eugen Kittel of the Württemberg State Railways developed a new firebox. Seventeen were built for the Württemberg State Railways and railcars were also made for the Royal Saxon State Railways, Swiss Northeastern Railway and Imperial Royal Austrian State Railways, and the Grand Duchy of Baden State Railway in 1914–15.

In 1918, the Austrian State Railways unit passed to the Czechoslovak State Railways after Austria-Hungary was divided at the end of World War I. At the end of World War II units were divided between the Deutsche Reichsbahn of East Germany, Deutsche Bundesbahn of West Germany and SNCF of France and all units had been withdrawn by 1953.

In 1906, the Prussian state railways bought two steam railcars, one fired by coal and the other oil, from Hannoversche Maschinenbau AG.

Seven Bavarian MCCi units were built between 1906 and 1908 for the Royal Bavarian State Railways for suburban services in the Munich area, the coach bodies being manufactured by MAN and the engines by Maffei. These had all been withdrawn by the end of the 1920s.

A steam railcar, DR 59, was built by Wismar in 1937 to reduce the dependency on imported diesel or petrol. After the war ownership of the car passed to the Deutsche Reichsbahn of East Germany, and in 1959 was converted into a driving trailer and withdrawn in 1975.

India

The Great Indian Peninsula Railway bought one steam railcar in 1906 from Kerr, Stuart and Company. In 1906, the North Western State Railway purchased a steam motor coach from Vulcan Foundry and in 1907 the East Indian Railway bought five steam railcars from Nasmyth, Wilson and Company. In 1925, Sentinel and Metro-Cammell built five twin-car units for the Bengal Nagpur Railway.

Italy

In 1904, two steam railcars were ordered from Purrey; classified as FS 80 these were withdrawn in 1913. Sixty-five railcars, classified as FS 60, were purchased in 1905 to 1907, but found to be under-powered and sixteen were converted into locomotives. At the 1906 Milan Fair an FS 85 (it) was exhibited and three were purchased by Kerr, Stuart and Company, followed by 12 also British built FS 86 (it).

In 1938, three railcars using high-pressure steam were purchased and classified ALv 72 (it). These were sold to  Ferrovie Padane in 1940 and converted into passenger coaches.

Japan

The Japanese Government Railways had several steam railcars in their employ before experimenting with petrol and diesel cars.

Mali

French manufacturers Buffaud & Robatel built a steam railcar for the metre gauge Chemin de fer de Kayes au Niger in Mali.

Mauritius
In 1907, the Mauritius Government Railways purchased a steam railcar from Kerr, Stuart and Company.

Namibia

In 1907, the Otavi Mining and Railway Company in German South West Africa (today's Namibia) purchased two steam railcars built by MAN SE in cooperation with Maffei for 600 mm gauge.

New Zealand

In 1925 and 1926, two steam railcars were supplied to New Zealand Railways Department, one from Sentinel and Cammell and the other from Claytons. They were both withdrawn after a few years.

Nigeria
The Nigerian Railways purchased several 3-car steam railcar units in 1954 from Metro-Cammell. The units were articulated, with an oil-fired boiler supplying steam.

North America
In North America, a railcar is known as a Doodlebug and the steam railcar as a steam motor car. The New England Railroad purchased a steam motor car by Schenectady Locomotive Works in 1897. In 1906, the Canadian Pacific Railway had an oil fired steam railcar and in 1908 the Chicago, Rock Island and Pacific Railroad purchased one by Alco-Schenectady.

In 1911, the Atchison, Topeka and Santa Fe Railway built a steam-powered railcar combining a Jacobs-Schupert boiler and a Ganz Works power truck in an American Car and Foundry body.  The resulting doodlebug was designated M-104.  It operated experimentally under its own power for only three months.  With the steam machinery removed and an unpowered bogie truck substituted, the car operated as an unpowered combine (combination baggage-coach car) until the 1960s.

The steam motor cars in North America reached their popular apex before the 1880s, with most fabricated to custom designs by small specialty builders before 1875. nearly all examples were unique and purpose-built to order; a few were experimental cars built and marketed by small firms or individuals on a trial basis and often not entirely successful due to their uniqueness or relative costs. The rise of electric traction was one cause for the ultimate demise of American steam motor cars.

Portugal

In 1906, the Portuguese Railway Company purchased two steam railcars from Borsig.

South Africa
There were a total of three steam railcars in South Africa, all imported from Britain and all running on the Cape gauge of 1,067 mm common there.

Sudan
The Sudan Government Railways bought two steam railcars from Clayton Wagons in 1929.

Sweden

Steam railcars were used in Sweden in the 1880s.

Switzerland

In 1889, steam railcars were built for the Pilatus Railway, a rack railway in Switzerland with a maximum gradient of 48%.

Cars Nos. 1-9 were built by the Swiss Locomotive and Machine Works in Winterthur, followed by No. 10 in 1900 and no. 11 in 1909. The railway was electrified in 1937, and the cars scrapped except for two. Car no. 9 remained until 1981 as a reserve and has since been in the Swiss Transport Museum in Lucerne. Car no. 10 is on permanent loan to the Deutsches Museum in Munich.

In 1902, a steam railcar was built by Maschinenfabrik Esslingen. Not a success, it was rebuilt in 1907 and sold to the Uerikon Bauma Railway. The railcar was withdrawn in 1950 and  the railcar is restored.

Trinidad and Tobago
The Trinidad Government Railway purchased two steam railcars secondhand from the London, Brighton and South Coast Railway in 1921, but they have never been put in operation.
One of the coach parts was converted into the Governor's saloon and the other into a second class carriage. In 1931, a Sentinel-Cammell twin articulated steam railcar was acquired.

Notes and references

References

Sources and further reading
Britain
 
 

 

Austria-Hungary
The following books are in German

Dieter Bäzold, Rolf Löttgers, Günther Scheingraber u. a.: Preußen-Report, Band 9: Zahnrad- und Schmalspurlokomotiven, Triebwagen. Eisenbahn-Journal, Hermann Merker Verlag, Fürstenfeldbruck 1996 Modelleisenbahner Nr. 4: Preußische Dampftriebwagen der Bauart Stoltz, April 1988, S. 17–20

Verzeichnis der Lokomotiven, Tender, Wasserwagen und Triebwagen der k. k. österreichischen Staatsbahnen und der vom Staate betriebenen Privatbahnen nach dem Stande vom 30. Juni 1917, 14. Auflage, Verlag der k. k. österreichischen Staatsbahnen, Wien, 1918

The following books are in Czech

The following books are in Hungarian

Germany
These sources are in German

Fritz Näbrich, Günter Meyer, Reiner Preuß: Lokomotivarchiv Sachsen 2, Transpress VEB Verlag für Verkehrswesen, Berlin, 1983	
Krauss-Maffei, Deutsches Museum Munich (ca. 1977): Lokomotiven im Deutschen Museum

Other countries
These sources are in German

External links

Railcars
1847 introductions
1847 in rail transport